Tommy Bryce (born 27 January 1960 in Johnstone) is a Scottish former footballer. Bryce had a playing career spanning 21 seasons from 1980–81 with Scottish Football League clubs Kilmarnock, Stranraer, Queen of the South, Clydebank, Ayr United and Arbroath.

Bryce also served as player-manager of Partick Thistle during the 1998-99 season. Since retiring as a player Bryce has been a manager in Scottish Junior football.

Career
Bryce was signed for Queens by manager Nobby Clark. Bryce is referred to at as 'Tommy Bryce Mark 2' to avoid confusion with the Tommy Bryce who played for Queens in the 1970s. When Bryce (Mark 2) was later interviewed for the Queens official website, among those he named as the best players he played beside were George Cloy, Jimmy Robertson, Alan Davidson and Jim Thomson.

At Queens Bryce scored a hat-trick in 1 minute and 46 seconds meriting an application to the Guinness Book of Records as the fastest hat-trick in senior football. Bryce is also the seventh highest goalscorer in the Dumfries club's history with 95 goals.

The appointment of Bryce as Partick Thistle's player-manager in 1998 came as a surprise. Bryce failed to turn the club's fortunes around that season, however, and he was replaced by John Lambie in March 1999.

On 18 July 2013 Bryce was appointed the manager of Scottish Junior club Glenafton Athletic from New Cumnock.
. On 4 January 2015 Bryce resigned as the manager of Glenafton Athletic.

See also
 List of footballers in Scotland by number of league appearances (500+)

References

External links 
 
 

1960 births
Living people
People from Johnstone
Scottish footballers
Association football forwards
Kilmarnock F.C. players
Stranraer F.C. players
Queen of the South F.C. players
Clydebank F.C. (1965) players
Ayr United F.C. players
Partick Thistle F.C. players
Arbroath F.C. players
Scottish Football League players
Scottish football managers
Partick Thistle F.C. managers
Footballers from Renfrewshire
Scottish Football League managers
Scottish Junior Football Association managers
Glenafton Athletic F.C. managers